Thio Him Tjiang (28 August 1929 – 14 February 2015) was an Indonesian footballer. He competed in the men's tournament at the 1956 Summer Olympics.

Honours

Indonesia
Asian Games Bronze medal: 1958

References

External links
 
 

1929 births
2015 deaths
Indonesian footballers
Indonesia international footballers
Olympic footballers of Indonesia
Footballers at the 1956 Summer Olympics
Sportspeople from Jakarta
Association football midfielders
Asian Games medalists in football
Medalists at the 1958 Asian Games
Asian Games bronze medalists for Indonesia
Footballers at the 1958 Asian Games
Persija Jakarta players
Indonesian people of Chinese descent
Indonesian sportspeople of Chinese descent
20th-century Indonesian people
21st-century Indonesian people